In Greek mythology, Polypoetes (Polupoitēs) was a name attributed to the following individuals:

Polypoetes, the Aetolian son of Apollo and Phthia, brother of Dorus and Laodocus. He was killed by Aetolus.
Polypoetes, son of Hippodamia and Pirithous. A native of the Thessalian city of Gyrtone (Γυρτώνη), he led the armies of Thessaly on the side of the Greeks during the Trojan War. He was among those who vied for Helen's hand in marriage, and later occupied the Trojan horse. Following the death of Patroclus, he won an early version of quoits, winning a 5-year supply of iron. After the war, he was present at the funerals of Calchas and Patroclus. His close companion was Leonteus.
Polypoetes, one of the Suitors of Penelope who came from Dulichium along with other 56 wooers. He, with the other suitors, was killed by Odysseus with the help of Eumaeus, Philoetius, and Telemachus.

Notes

References 

 Apollodorus, The Library with an English Translation by Sir James George Frazer, F.B.A., F.R.S. in 2 Volumes, Cambridge, Massachusetts, Harvard University Press; London, William Heinemann Ltd. 1921. ISBN 0-674-99135-4. Online version at the Perseus Digital Library.
 Homer, The Iliad with an English Translation by A.T. Murray, Ph.D. in two volumes. Cambridge, Massachusetts, Harvard University Press; London, William Heinemann, Ltd. 1924. . Online version at the Perseus Digital Library.

Children of Apollo
Demigods in classical mythology
Kings in Greek mythology
Achaean Leaders
People of the Trojan War
Characters in Book VI of the Aeneid
Suitors of Penelope
Aetolian characters in Greek mythology